Wayne's World: Music from the Motion Picture is the soundtrack album for the 1992 comedy film Wayne's World, released on February 18, 1992. The album was certified double-Platinum by the RIAA on July 16, 1997.

Track listing
 "Bohemian Rhapsody" - Queen
 "Hot and Bothered" - Cinderella
 "Rock Candy" - BulletBoys
 "Dream Weaver" - Gary Wright (Rerecorded Version)
 "Sikamikanico" - Red Hot Chili Peppers
 "Time Machine" - Black Sabbath
 "Wayne's World Theme" - Mike Myers/Dana Carvey (Extended Version)
 "Ballroom Blitz" - Tia Carrere
 "Foxy Lady" - The Jimi Hendrix Experience
 "Feed My Frankenstein" - Alice Cooper
 "Ride With Yourself" - Rhino Bucket
 "Loving Your Lovin'" - Eric Clapton
 "Why You Wanna Break My Heart" - Tia Carrere (originally recorded by Dwight Twilley)
 "Loud Love" - Soundgarden (Not included on all versions)

Songs featured in the film but not included on the soundtrack album:

"Cold Chills" - Kix
"Everything About You" - Ugly Kid Joe
"Fire" - Tia Carrere (originally recorded by The Jimi Hendrix Experience.  Carrere's version has never been commercially released)
"Making Our Dreams Come True" - Cyndi Grecco
"All Night Thing" - Temple of the Dog
"Touch Me" - Tia Carrere (originally recorded by Private Life. Carrere's version has never been commercially released)
Happy Birthday, Mr. President - Mike Myers

Charts

Weekly charts

Year-end charts

Certifications

References

Further reading

1992 soundtrack albums
1990s film soundtrack albums
Comedy film soundtracks
Albums produced by Ted Templeman
Reprise Records soundtracks
Wayne's World